The World Organisation for Animal Health (OIE) is an inter-governmental organisation whose 182 Members have mandated it to improve animal health and welfare worldwide.
Created in 1924 under the name of Office International des Epizooties, it had only 28 member countries at the beginning. Those countries were: Argentine Republic, Belgium, Brazil, Bulgaria, Denmark, Egypt, Spain, Finland, France, Great Britain, Greece, Guatemala, Hungary, Italy, Luxemburg, Morocco, Mexico, the Principality of Monaco, the Netherlands, Peru, Poland, Portugal, Romania, Siam (Thailand), Sweden, Switzerland, the Czechoslovak Republic, and Tunisia.

Member States
Original members are listed bold.

Notes

External links
 World Organisation for Animal Health
 About Member countries

References

Animal welfare
Countries by international organization